The Battle of Nahrawan was fought between the army of Caliph Ali and the rebel group Kharijites in July 658 CE (Safar 38 AH). They used to be a group of pious allies of Ali during the First Muslim Civil War. They separated from him following the Battle of Siffin when Ali agreed to settle the dispute with Mu'awiya, governor of Syria, through negotiations, a move labeled by the group as "against the Qur'an". After failed attempts to regain their loyalty and because of their rebellious and murderous activities, Ali confronted the Kharijites near their headquarters by the Nahrawan Canal, near modern-day Baghdad. Of the 4,000 rebels, some 1,200 were won over with the promise of amnesty while the majority of the remaining 2,800 rebels were killed in the ensuing battle. Other sources put the casualties at 1500–1800.

The battle resulted in a permanent split between the group and the rest of the Muslims, whom the Kharijites, due to their extremist nature ("ghuluww"; غلو in Arabic), branded as apostates. Although defeated, they continued to threaten and harass cities and towns for several years. Ali was assassinated by a Kharijite in January 661.

Background

The controversial policies of the third Caliph Uthman resulted in a rebellion that led to his assassination in 656. Ali ibn Abi Talib, the son-in-law and cousin of Muhammad, was subsequently elected caliph by the Medinese people and the Iraqi dissidents present in Medina. His election was challenged by some of Muhammad's companions, including Talha ibn Ubayd Allah and Zubayr ibn al-Awwam, and by Muhammad's widow A'isha. Mu'awiya, the governor of Syria and Uthman's relative, also denounced Ali's election and demanded retribution against Uthman's killers. Although Ali defeated the rebellion of Talha and Zubayr in the Battle of the Camel in 656, his war against Mu'awiya resulted in a stalemate at Siffin in 657 when Mu'awiya called for arbitration by the Qur'an to avoid defeat. Ali's forces stopped fighting, despite repeated warnings from Ali that the appeal to their holy book was a deception. Nevertheless, an arbitration committee was set up with representatives from Ali's and Mu'awiya's sides with a mandate to settle the dispute in the spirit of the Qur'an. As Ali marched back to Kufa, his capital, schisms surfaced in his army. A group of his soldiers criticized the arbitration and accused Ali of blasphemy for leaving the matter to the discretion of two men and not acting according to the Book of God. Most of them had earlier forced Ali to accept the arbitration, but afterward exclaimed that the right to judgment belonged to God alone. Twelve thousand of the dissenters defected from the army and settled at a place near Kufa called Harura, becoming known as the Harurites.

Ali, after some time, visited the Harura camp and persuaded the defectors to abandon their protest and return to Kufa. According to some accounts, they returned on the condition that the war against Mu'awiya be resumed after six months and Ali acknowledge his mistake, which he did on general and ambiguous terms. Nevertheless, Ali refused to denounce the arbitration and the proceedings continued. In March 658, he sent his arbitration delegation headed by Abu Musa Ash'ari to carry out the talks. Consequently, the Kharijites decided to leave him. In order to avoid being detected, they moved out in small groups and went to a place by the Nahrawan Canal on the east bank of the Tigris. Some five hundred of their Basran comrades were informed and they also joined them in Nahrawan. Following this exodus, they were called as Khawarij, those who leave.

Prelude

The Kharijites denounced Ali as caliph, declared him, his followers, and the Syrians as infidels, and instead elected Abd Allah ibn Wahb al-Rasibi as their caliph. They declared the blood of such infidels to be licit.

In the meantime, the two arbitrators announced that Uthman had been killed unjustly by the rebels. After this verdict, which strengthened the Syrian's support for Mu'awia, the arbitration process collapsed. At that point, Ali denounced the arbitrators as contrary to Quran and mobilized his supporters to renew the war against Mu'awiya. He summoned the Kharijites to join him. They refused, unless he acknowledged that he had gone astray and repent. Ali decided to depart for Syria without them. When Ali's forces voiced their concern about the threat of Kharijites, Ali persuaded them in a speech that the war against Mu'awiya was more important and ordered his troops to depart for Syria.

According to W. Madelung, around this time, the Kharijites started the practice of interrogating civilians about their views on Uthman and Ali, and executing those who did not share their views. They are alleged to have disemboweled a farmer's pregnant wife, cut out and killed her unborn infant, before beheading the farmer. Ali received the news of the Kharijites' violence en route to Syria and sent one of his men to investigate, but he too was killed by the Kharijites. His soldiers now implored him to neutralize the threat of Kharijites, out of fear for the safety of their families and properties in Kufa. Ali then moved to Nahrawan with his army, estimated to be 14,000-strong.

Battle

Ali asked the Kharjites to surrender the murderers and accept peace. If they did, he would leave them alone and depart to fight the Syrians. The Kharijites responded defiantly that all of them were responsible for the murders as they all considered it licit to kill his followers. After further exchanges, the Kharijite leaders instructed their followers not to engage in further discussion and instead prepare for martyrdom and to meet their Lord in Paradise. Both sides arranged in battle order and Ali announced an amnesty for any Kharijite who would join him or return to Kufa and that only murderers would be punished. About 1,200 Kharijites accepted his offer, some joining Ali's army, others returning to Kufa or leaving the battlefield for refuge in the mountains; Ibn Wahb was consequently left with 2,800 fighters.

Most of the Kharijites were foot-soldiers, while Ali's army consisted of archers, cavalry, and foot-soldiers. He sent his cavalry in front of the infantry, which was divided in two rows, and stationed archers in between the first row and the cavalry. He ordered his army to let the opposing side commence hostilities. The Kharijites attacked Ali's forces with vigor and broke through his cavalry. The archers showered them with arrows, the cavalry attacked from behind and the foot-soldiers attacked with swords and spears. Heavily outnumbered and surrounded, most of the Kharijites, including the Caliph Ibn Wahb, were quickly slaughtered. Some 2,400 Kharijites were  killed, and 400 wounded among them were sent back to their families in Kufa after the battle. On Ali's side, between seven and thirteen men were said to have died.

Aftermath
After the battle, Ali ordered his army to march with him on Syria. They refused due to exhaustion, seeking to recover their energies in Kufa, after which they would embark on the Syrian campaign. Ali agreed and moved to Nukhayla, a mustering ground outside Kufa, and permitted his soldiers to rest and occasionally visit their homes. His soldiers were unwilling to go on the campaign and in the next few days the camp was almost completely deserted. Consequently, he had to abandon his plans. The slaughter of Ali's erstwhile allies and pious Qur'an readers undermined Ali's position as Caliph. He was eventually assassinated by the Kharijite Abd al-Rahman ibn Muljam in January 661.

Although the Kharijites were crushed, their insurgency continued for several years and the Battle of Nahrawan cemented their break from the Muslim community. Many of them abandoned city life and resorted to brigandage, robbery, pillaging settled areas and other anti-state activities throughout the reign of Ali and later that of Mu'awiya, who became caliph a few months after Ali's assassination. During the second Muslim civil war they controlled large parts of Arabia and Persia, but were later subdued by the Umayyad governor of Iraq, Hajjaj ibn Yusuf. They were, however, not eliminated until the 10th century.

References

Sources
 
 
 
 
 
 
 
 

Nahrawan
First Fitna
Shia days of remembrance
Kharijite rebellions